Clean Air Network (CAN) is an independent non-governmental organisation exclusively focused on the issue of air pollution in Hong Kong. CAN aims to educate the public about the health impacts of air pollution and to mobilise public support for cleaner air in Hong Kong. According to Civic Exchange's environmental program director Mike Kilburn, CAN was created with the purpose of encouraging the public to speak out and support government measures that could improve the quality of air in Hong Kong.

History
CAN was established in July 2009, following a Civic Exchange conference focused on Hong Kong's air pollution situation in January of the same year. The Civic Exchange held a conference titled "The Air We Breathe – A Public Health Dialogue", during which the idea of an organisation exclusively focused on air pollution aimed toward creating change at the highest level of government sparked.

Objectives

Clean Air Network envisions to clean up Hong Kong's air until it meets World Health Organization's recommended safe level in order to protect public health.

CAN's mission is to amplify voices of individuals, groups and organisations, and together urge the government to take appropriate measures to clean up Hong Kong's air immediately.

In 2017, CAN focused primarily to tackle local roadside air pollution, while regularly monitor the progress to reduce emission from marine vessels, power plants and regional sources.

Approach
Describing itself as a network, the company strives to bring together and amplify the voices of individuals, groups and organisations in order to pressurise the government to take immediate actions to clean Hong Kong's air. The establishment is focused on informing the general public and aims to present information in ways that are digestible to laypeople.

The organisation consistently supports the government in its endeavours to clean up Hong Kong's air through non-confrontational means, acting as its "honest mirror". CAN works closely with District Councilors, Legislative Council members, and private sector corporations. The company also maintains close relations with the Environmental Protection Department and provides research reports, fact sheets and other documents on issues related to its work to help raise awareness and provide information to policy and decision makers.

CAN has also given numerous talks at educational institutions. In addition to speaking to and maintaining close relations with student groups at many of Hong Kong's universities (Hong Kong University, Chinese University of Hong Kong, Hong Kong Polytechnic University, Hong Kong University of Science & Technology), CAN has also spoken at local and international schools. The organisation also offers a student air monitoring program, which allows students to physically monitor the air pollutants of their school and home environments first-hand. Within the 2011–2012 school year, a total of 11 schools will have participated in their program. The company believes that the involvement of youth is essential in laying the foundation for an environmentally-conscious society, and thus has pioneered many activities specifically suited for them.

The Clean Air Network regularly uses social media, including services such as YouTube and Twitter, to spread its message and to provide updates on air pollution-related issues. For instance, the organisation offers real-time email alerts that note when air pollution levels reach hazardous levels (API exceeding 100). CAN also offers a weekly e-newsletter that summarises news headlines, events, and other information relevant to air pollution and its operations. Additionally, they hold unique educational events targeting the public, ranging from scavenger hunts to film festivals. For example, CAN held a mask design competition in the district of Sham Shui Po ("罩量─深水埗口罩設計較量" in Chinese) which engaged local artists and emphasised the severity of air pollution in Hong Kong.

CAN also works towards gathering and articulating the public's opinion by both conducting in-house surveys and by offering a database of survey results from external organisations. For example, the organisation administered surveys from 10 paediatrician's offices that looked at parent's knowledge and attitudes towards Hong Kong's air quality and their children's respiratory health.

Work

Anti-Idling Bill
The Anti-idling Ordinance has been a significant milestone in the regulation of Hong Kong's road side emissions. The bill, first brought to the public attention in June 2010, was intended to prevent motorists from keeping their engines on while not in motion. The anti-idling ban now offers a three-minute grace period every hour a vehicle is running and various other exemptions.

CAN has been in support of the bill since its inception. In June 2010, during the Legislative Council's hearing of public statements for and against the anti-idling bill, the organisation secured the appearance of two Hong Kong medical associations, the Hong Kong Society of Pediatrics and the Hong Kong Asthma Society, represented by Dr. Aaron Yu Chak-man and Dr. Alfred Tam Yat-cheung, respectively. Both doctors defended the bill and fielded questions from groups against the anti-idling ordinance. CAN also helped to bring about the unprecedented appearance of students at such events when students from Chinese International School, respectively, implored lawmakers to protect their health instead of subordinating society's interests to narrow constituencies’ demands. CAN also backed the Secretary of the Environment, Edward Yau by accompanying him during his consultation with Hong Kong's transportation industry workers.

CAN also recognises that exemptions to the anti-idling bill must be put into place, but must be done so cautiously in order to avoid defeating the purpose of the bill. Although such a law would not be the end all and be all solution to improving Hong Kong's roadside air quality, CAN's CEO Joanne Ooi believes that it is "a crucial step to changing attitudes in society at large towards air pollution."

Environmental Impact Assessment
The Clean Air Network has worked towards encouraging the Panel of Environmental Affairs to review its environmental impact assessment Ordinance and to make amendments so that public health is considered during the assessment of new infrastructure projects. CAN wrote a letter to LegCo outlining the possible amendments to the Technical Memorandum. These changes suggested that the EIA should describe how the environment and community might be affected by the above change and what possible mitigation measures the party could use.

With a third runway proposed to be built by the Hong Kong Airport Authority, CAN has done much to ensure that the project would not proceed unless a fully comprehensive Environmental Impact Assessment has been carried out by the HKAA. The organisation jointly sent a letter to urge the EPD to seek further information from the HKAA to resolve or amend its EIA so that the project profile meets the requirements of the Environmental Impact Assessment Ordinance. During the public consultation period, CAN was present along with 11 other environmental groups to voice their concerns. According to SCMP, this public consultation was "a first in the history of EIA submissions in terms of the level of attention it [received] from environmental groups".

According to CAN's Campaign Manager Erica Chan, "Many important issues are not explored in-depth in this project profile and that gives us a great deal of concern as to how much the development of the third runway will aggravate air pollution in Tung Chung and its surrounding areas, and even all of Hong Kong."

Hong Kong Chief executive Candidates
With CAN's campaigning and petitioning, the organisation was able to bring the issue of air pollution onto the radar of the Hong Kong Chief executive Candidates during the years of 2011–2012.

In December 2011, CAN presented the three Chief executive Candidates Henry Tang, CY Leung and Albert Ho with a "Clean Air Ballot" and a symbolic pair of black lungs. All three candidates accepted CAN's "clean air ballot" and pledged to improve air quality. This event received much note from the local news.

On 3 March 2012 CAN, along with the WWF-Hong Kong, Greenpeace and Friends of the Earth hosted an Environmental Policy Forum where the candidates did a question and answer period with the public. This was an achievement as this forum both began a dialogue on environmental issues and allowed the public to voice their concerns.

PM2.5
The organisation offers self-monitored air quality reports twice daily from Monday to Friday, which has been available even before the government's release of air quality data. Their data is taken from their Sheung Wan office and is based on an hourly average. CAN also offers alerts when API levels reach hazardous levels (above API 100). This information is accessible on their website and through their various social media outlets, such as Facebook and Twitter. CAN also rents out PM2.5 monitoring machines, SIDEPAK AM510s, thus allowing people to monitor the air quality in their own homes and neighbourhoods.

The organisation has used their PM2.5 data as a means of bringing attention to the health concerns associated with Hong Kong's air pollution. For instance, their preliminary air quality monitoring showed that PM2.5 levels exceeded the recommended guidelines from the WHO. CAN also intended for their self-monitored report to act as a catalyst in encouraging the government to publish citywide PM2.5 levels in real-time. CAN believes that real time PM2.5 data is necessary, as "people need to know, right now, the level of air pollution harming their health," according to CAN campaign manager Erica Chan. Eventually, through politicising and lobbying, CAN influenced the Environmental Protection Department (EPD) to monitor PM2.5 levels every hour and to release the data to the public. Data is now gathered from 14 different monitoring stations, although the organisation still finds the government's actions inadequate as a majority of monitors are placed above ground level and do not accurately measure the pollutants the average person would be exposed to. As well, six districts in Hong Kong still lack air quality monitoring stations, with the said districts being the Southern District, Wong Tai Sin, Kowloon City, North, Sai Kung and Tuen Mun.

Social Media and Technology
Aside from the use of Facebook, Twitter, and other social media platforms, Clean Air Network has used other technological means to engage with the public.

In Sept 2009, CAN teamed up with a youth filmmaking non-governmental organisation, Focus on Film, to raise public awareness about the issue of Hong Kong's air quality. "Clean Air 1–2 Go" involved 200 students who made short films about Hong Kong's air pollution that were eventually aired on monitors in Hong Kong's major malls.

During the Summer of 2010, CAN introduced a suite of innovative environmental information tools comprising a Real-time Air Pollution Facebook Widget, Real-time Air Pollution Email Alerts (Beta), an iPhone app and Daily Lunchtime Roadside Pollution Tweets. These tools give the public immediate, updated readings about air pollution and, in some cases, push alerts, in a convenient, readable format, allowing them to stay on top of air pollution conditions in real time.

Of particular significance is a public service announcement CAN released. The video stars popular celebrities Daniel Wu, Ana R., Simon Yin and Cara G, and is shot in the style of a 1980s-style infomercial. The PSA is a fake advertisement about canned oxygen brand and takes a humorous, satirical approach in order to provoke viewers to imagine pollution so bad that one has to purchase healthy air from a can in order to perform even everyday functions. This video is claimed to be the most successful in Hong Kong NGO history and has since gone viral, with the Cantonese version receiving more than 210K views.

CAN also organised Hong Kong's first flash mob dedicated to air pollution in June 2011. In this event, 80 volunteers wearing gas masks and T-shirts bearing health messages pretended to die from air pollution by laying sprawled on the pavement outside of Sogo. The bizarre sight garnered the attention of passersby and educated them about the health concerns associated with air pollution.

Air Quality Objectives
Prior to 2009, Hong Kong's AQOs had not seen revision for more than 20 years. CAN believes that relevant AQOs are essential to having good air quality and that in constructing the air quality objectives, the government should hold the protection of public health as their primary objective.

CAN has pressured the government to update and enforce its Air Quality Objectives on many instances. In January 2011, CAN, Friends of the Earth and other green groups filed an ombudsman complaint collectively in order to protest the government's failure to fulfill their promise to review and revise the Air Quality Objectives. The organisations requested that the government set a timetable to meet the objectives and explain to the public whether any progress has been made. Although following the complaint the government was not found guilty of maladministration, the ordeal was able to garner public attention towards the government's lack of action.

In December 2011, CAN held a Dark Christmas Carnival in protest of Donald Tsang's had promised that by the end of the year –generally lax attitude towards cleaning Hong Kong's air. Approximately 50 participants decked out in black clothing and costumes gathered in causeway bay, where they filled black balloons with polluted air. The crowd then marched to the Government House where the balloon was popped and the gift of polluted, roadside air was given to Donald Tsang. At the scene, CAN's CEO Stephen Wong gave a speech where he explained that the state of Hong Kong air is at critical levels and that the gift was in hopes of allowing the Chief Executive to understand how it feels to breathe in roadside air. This event saw much coverage from local news stations, including Oriental Daily, Apple Daily, MingPao, and Yahoo.

In light of Donald Tsang's failure to keep his promise of announcing new AQOs within 2011 and to "combat air pollution in order to protect public health," Clean Air Network collaborated with Friends of the Earth in a petition for clean air. 10,000 signatures were collected during the petition, numbers which represented a significantly stronger response from the public, in comparison to their petition held throughout the year of 2010, where 25,000 signatures were collected.

Although the Clean Air Network was content with the government's proposal of new AQOs in 2012, the organisation still saw that they were not up to par in protecting public health. Clean Air Network's CEO Helen Choy stated that the AQOs "are not even close to being comparable to the WHO's recommended guidelines" and that the Government "should set a clear timetable for adopting the WHO's recommended guidelines". The organisation has also done independent research surrounding the issues with the new AQOs which they have published, including a budget study which outlined the government's economic investments towards cleaning Hong Kong's air.

Community Outreach
The Clean Air Network greatly focuses on dispersing information about air pollution through various facets in order to reach a great demographic. In the spring of 2011, CAN joined up with Sotheby's and 40 international artists to hold a Clean Air Auction, the first of its kind and scale in Asia. Environmentally-themed artwork was on display in IFC's oval atrium in March and subsequently auctioned in April at Sotheby's Hong Kong Contemporary Asian Art Spring Auction at the Hong Kong Convention and Exhibition Center. The auction ended with the sale of 42 lots and raised a total of $2.2 million.

As well, CAN holds an annual event called the Airmazing Race, a scavenger hunt intended to raise awareness towards air pollution through the completion of various tasks. On 25 July 2011, CAN held their first instalment of The Airmazing Race where Approximately 300 youths aged 11–18, representing 75 schools, competed in this scavenger hunt for clean air. The race consisted of tasks that ranged from finding and photographing Hong Kong's three air monitoring system to taking photographs with "the blue man". The race is also to be held again in July of the following year where around 800 students are expected to take part.

Education
During the first half of 2011, CAN wrote six bilingual educational modules about air pollution for secondary school students and teachers to assist in the teaching of Hong Kong secondary school's Liberal Studies requirement. The materials were made available to the public through Ming Pao's Liberal Studies portal. Letters were sent to all schools in Hong Kong informing teachers and principals about the availability of the materials.

CAN also routinely holds student air quality monitoring programs in conjunction with schools in the Hong Kong area. This program has been done with approximately 20 schools, including the Diocesan Boys' School and Lingnan Secondary School.

References

External links 
 Clean Air Network
 Hedley Environmental Index
 Clean Air Network Official Facebook Page

Air pollution organizations
Organizations established in 2009
Environmental organisations based in Hong Kong
2009 establishments in Hong Kong